Bowling competitions at the 2019 Pan American Games in Lima, Peru are scheduled to be held between July 25 and 30, 2019 at the Bowling Centre located at the Villa Deportiva Nacional Videna.

Four medal events are scheduled to be contested, a singles and doubles events for each men and women. A total of 64 bowlers will qualify to compete at the games.

Medal table

Medalists  

  Jean Pérez was stripped of his gold medal due to a doping violation. Puerto Rico team was disqualified.

Participating nations
A total of 17 countries qualified bowlers. The number of athletes a nation entered is in parentheses beside the name of the country.

Qualification

A total of 64 bowlers will qualify to compete. Each nation may enter a maximum of 4 athletes (four per gender). In each gender there will be a total of 16 pairs qualified, with one spot per event (so a total of four bowlers) reserved for the host nation Peru. There will be a total of five qualification events.

References

External links
Results book

 
Events at the 2019 Pan American Games
2019
2019 in bowling